MPX may refer to:

Technology
 MPX filter, a function found in cassette decks
 Multiplexing, the process of combining multiple analog or digital signals into one
 Multiplexer, an electronic device which accomplishes this task

Computing
 Multi-Pointer X, an extension to X.Org
 MPX Microsoft Project Exchange File Format, a Microsoft Project file format
 Intel MPX, a set of Memory Protection Extensions to the x86 instruction set architecture
 .mpx, a video file format in the Kingston K-PEX 100
 IBM 1800 MPX, in the list of operating systems
 MPX bus, a PowerPC CPU bus, for example in the PowerPC G4

Other uses
 MPX Energia, former name of the Brazilian utility company Eneva
 MPI MPXpress, a train locomotive
 SIG MPX, a submachine gun from SIG Sauer
 An abbreviation for monkeypox, an infectious viral disease